Andre Begemann and Lukáš Rosol were the defending champions, but they did not participate this year. When Prostějov tournament started, Rosol was still in play in doubles competition at French Open.

Julian Knowle and Philipp Oswald won the tournament, defeating Mateusz Kowalczyk and Igor Zelenay in the final, 4–6, 6–3, [11–9].

Seeds

Draw

References

External links
 Main Draw

UniCredit Czech Open - Doubles
2015 Doubles